Fredrik Kjølner (born 22 April 1970) is a Norwegian footballer. Since 1994 he has played almost 300 league matches in Norway, and captained FK Bodø/Glimt. At the end of 2005 Glimt was relegated from the Norwegian Premier League, and Kjølner moved to his native Nøtterøy, signing a contract with Sandefjord Fotball. Ahead of the 2009 season he signed for FK Tønsberg as player and youth coach.

External links
Guardian's Stats Centre

1970 births
Living people
People from Nøtterøy
Norwegian footballers
Eik-Tønsberg players
Vålerenga Fotball players
Molde FK players
FK Bodø/Glimt players
Sandefjord Fotball players
Eliteserien players
Association football defenders
Sportspeople from Vestfold og Telemark